Edmonton-Strathcona is a provincial electoral district for the Legislative Assembly of Alberta, Canada.  It shares the same name as the federal electoral district of Edmonton Strathcona.

The boundaries of Edmonton-Strathcona include the neighbourhoods of Garneau, Strathcona, Queen Alexandra, Pleasantview, Allendale, Malmo Plains, Empire Park, Bonnie Doon and Idylwylde, and encompasses the historic district of Old Strathcona.

History
The electoral district has existed since 1971, it was created from Strathcona Centre. The boundaries have changed repeatedly.

The 2010 boundary redistribution made some changes to the boundaries. The northwestern corner of the riding had some small alterations with Edmonton-Riverview. The parcel of land that comprised the east portion of the riding to give it its distinctive ell shape was expanded from Whyte Avenue south to 63 Avenue in land that was part of Edmonton-Mill Creek the eastern border was expanded out to run on the Mill Creek Ravine with Edmonton-Gold Bar.

In the 2015 provincial election, it was the only riding in the province that did not have a Wildrose Party candidate.

Boundary history

Representation history

The electoral district was created from the constituency of Strathcona-Centre and was first contested in 1971. Changing from a long history of electing Social Credit MLAs in the area, the constituency elected Conservative Julian Koziak from the Conservative landslide of 1971 to a local NDP breakthrough in 1986. In that period, the Conservative candidate was usually elected by a minority of the valid votes, the other votes were split between the SC, Liberal, NDP and other candidates.

Since 1975, the constituency has been one of the more left-leaning ridings in Edmonton and has held by either the NDP (1986–1993, 1997–present) or the Liberals (1993–1997) without interruption since 1986.

The election of 1971 saw a hotly contested three-way race as incumbent Social Credit MLA J. Donovan Ross ran for his sixth term in office. He had served as MLA for the predecessor district Strathcona Centre starting in 1959 and previously as an MLA for the multi-member Edmonton constituency starting in 1952. He was defeated by Progressive Conservative candidate Julian Koziak who won just under half the votes in the constituency.  Partly on the strength of a clean sweep of Edmonton, the Tories pushed out Social Credit to win government for the first time. The out-going SC MLA came in second. This was the last good showing of the SC in the district as it drifted off the scene. NDP candidate Timothy Christian polled a strong vote, carrying on the strong showing of the NDP that had previously been shown in that part of Edmonton since the formation of the Alberta NDP in 1962.

Koziak ran for his second term in 1975 and faced a hotly contested race against future NDP MLA Gordon Wright. Koziak was reelected after increasing his share of the vote to 54%, and was appointed to the provincial cabinet by Peter Lougheed in 1975. Koziak and Wright would face each other four more times.  Although this was during the height of the Lougheed government's popularity, Wright managed to narrow the margin each time. By 1982 Wright received only 500 fewer votes than Koziak, while Koziak won with about 48 percent of the votes cast.

The 1986 election, which saw the NDP win a record number of seats (16) in the province (up to that time), established the constituency as a stronghold for the NDP.  On his sixth attempt for the seat, Wright won in resounding fashion, defeating Koziak by almost 17 points. He won his second term in 1989 with a reduced majority and died a year later on October 18, 1990, leaving the seat vacant. A by-election was held in December 1990 and returned NDP candidate Barrie Chivers with a large majority.

Chivers ran for a second term in office in the 1993 election. He was defeated by Liberal candidate Al Zariwny, who won the riding with just under 40% of the vote. The Liberals swept Edmonton that year, due in part to a massive surge under its leader Laurence Decore, a former Edmonton mayor.

Zariwny did not stand for a second term in office in 1997 and the riding returned NDP candidate Raj Pannu by 58 votes over Liberal candidate Mary McDonald. That race was split almost three ways, with Pannu winning with just 31% of the vote. The third-placing candidate, Progressive Conservative John Logan, finished just 176 votes behind Pannu.

The NDP chose Pannu to be leader of the party in 2000. He ran for a second term a year later in 2001 under the slogan Raj Against the Machine. He was re-elected with a large majority, winning over half the vote. Pannu ceded the leadership of the NDP to Brian Mason in 2004. He ran for his second term in office and won the highest vote count in Edmonton-Strathcona history, with over 60%. Pannu retired from public life at dissolution of the Legislature in 2008.

The current MLA is Rachel Notley who was first elected in the 2008 election. She was re-elected in the 2012 provincial election with the highest share of the vote of any MLA in Alberta, and subsequently became the Premier of Alberta following the results of the 2015 provincial election after succeeding Brian Mason as the leader of the NDP.

Legislature results

Elections in the 1970s

Elections in the 1980s

Elections in the 1990s

Elections in the 2000s

Elections in the 2010s

Senate nominee results

Student Vote results

On November 19, 2004, a Student Vote was conducted at participating Alberta schools to parallel the 2004 Alberta general election results. The vote was designed to educate students and simulate the electoral process for persons who have not yet reached the legal majority. The vote was conducted in 80 of the 83 provincial electoral districts with students voting for actual election candidates. Schools with a large student body that reside in another electoral district had the option to vote for candidates outside of the electoral district then where they were physically located.

See also
List of Alberta provincial electoral districts

References

Further reading

External links
Elections Alberta
The Legislative Assembly of Alberta

Alberta provincial electoral districts
Politics of Edmonton
1971 establishments in Alberta
Constituencies established in 1971